Arachis ipaensis is a herb in the Faboideae subfamily. This plant is cited as gene sources for research in plant biology of peanut (Arachis hypogaea). Its genome has been sequenced.

References

ipaensis